Washington's 17th legislative district is one of forty-nine districts in Washington state for representation in the state legislature.

The district includes eastern Vancouver and other parts of southwest Clark County east of I-205.

This urban district is represented state senator Lynda Wilson and state representatives Kevin Waters (position 1) and Paul Harris (position 2), all Republicans.

See also
Washington Redistricting Commission
Washington State Legislature
Washington State Senate
Washington House of Representatives

References

External links
Washington State Redistricting Commission
Washington House of Representatives
Map of Legislative Districts

17